Dalia Muhammad Ahmad El-Gebaly (born 26 March 1992) is an Egyptian synchronized swimmer who competed in the 2008 and 2012 Summer Olympics.

Personal life
El-Gebaly was born in Cairo, Egypt.

Synchronised Swimming
In 2008, El-Gebaly made her Olympic debut. El-Gebaly and partner Reem Abdalazem competed in Duet at the Olympic Games, coming 24th. She also participated in Team, coming 8th.

In 2009, El-Gebaly and Shaza El-Sayed competed in Thematic Duet at the FINA Synchro World Trophy. The duet placed 10th with a score of 85.000.

In 2012, El-Gebaly and El-Sayed competed in Duet at the Olympic Games, again coming 24th. El-Gebaly also competed in the team event, placing 7th.

External links

References

1992 births
Living people
Egyptian synchronized swimmers
Olympic synchronized swimmers of Egypt
Synchronized swimmers at the 2008 Summer Olympics
Synchronized swimmers at the 2012 Summer Olympics
21st-century Egyptian women